Sanger Wani or Sangerwani is a village in Pulwama district of the Indian union territory of Jammu and Kashmir.

Geography 
It is located north of Sangaroni village and  3.8 km west of Pakharpora Fire Station. It is 37 km away from Sheikh ul-Alam International Airport.

Population
As per 2011 Census of India, Sangerwani village had a population of 5558 of which 2917 are males and 2641 are females. The population lives in 1013 households. Its literacy rate is 26.74%.

Economy
The main occupation of the Sangerwani people is fruit cultivation. Others people are engaged in "marginal" activity.

References 

Villages in Pulwama district